Cochranella litoralis is a species of frog in the family Centrolenidae. It is known from the Pacific lowlands of southwestern Colombia (Cauca and Nariño Departments) and northern Ecuador (Esmeraldas Province). The specific name litoralis refers to the proximity of the type locality to the sea.

Description
Adult males measure  in snout–vent length; female size is unknown. The snout is truncated. The tympanum is visible and only slightly obscured by the supra-tympanic fold posterodorsally. The fingers have absent to moderate webbing (from inner to outer fingers). The toes are moderately webbed. The dorsum is yellowish green and has dark gray spots. The ventral parietal peritoneum is white. Adult males have a visible small humeral spine. The pre-pollical spine is clearly separated from the first finger. The iris is gray and has no evident dark reticulation.

Habitat and conservation
Reproduction is unknown but presumably takes place in streams. The Ecuadorian populations are threatened by logging.

References

litoralis
Amphibians of Colombia
Amphibians of Ecuador
Taxa named by John Douglas Lynch
Amphibians described in 1996
Taxonomy articles created by Polbot